The Cagayan Economic Zone Authority (CEZA) is a government-owned and controlled corporation (GOCC) tasked to manage and supervise the development of the Cagayan Special Economic Zone and Freeport (CSEZFP) in the Philippines.

Its creation and operation are mandated by virtue of Republic Act 7922, otherwise known as the “Cagayan Special Economic Zone Act of 1995” by then President Fidel V. Ramos. The Cagayan Economic Zone Act of 1995 was authored by former Senator Juan Ponce Enrile, a native of Gonzaga town in Cagayan. It is the first economic zone in the Philippines to offer to host of financial technology companies in the emerging fintech industry with the issuance of the first batch of FTSOVC certificates to three locators.

Overview
The Cagayan Special Economic Zone and Freeport, also known as Cagayan Freeport, is a special economic zone in Cagayan Province, northern Luzon, in the Philippines. It is envisioned to be a self-sustaining industrial, commercial, financial, tourism, and recreational center, in order to effectively encourage and attract legitimate and productive local and foreign investments and eventually create employment opportunities and increase income and productivity in the rural areas around Freeport Zone. The Cagayan Special Economic Zone also serves as one of the main gambling jurisdictions in the Philippines.

CEZA is headed by Leonardo Cruz as its Acting Administrator and Officer–in-Charge.

Location
Spatially, the Cagayan Economic Zone & Freeport covers the entire Municipality of Sta. Ana, including the Islands of Fuga, Barit, and Mabbag in the Municipality of Aparri in the Province of Cagayan. Approximately 54,118 hectares of land for prime development fall within the jurisdiction of CEZA. It is surrounded by the waters of Babuyan Channel and the South China Sea on the North and the Pacific Ocean in the east.

References

External links
First Cagayan Corp.
Cagayan Economic Zone Authority (CEZA) Official Website
Cagayan Economic Zone Act of 1995

Industrial parks in the Philippines
Buildings and structures in Cagayan
PEZA Special Economic Zones
Government agencies under the Office of the President of the Philippines
Government-owned and controlled corporations of the Philippines
Government agencies established in 1995